Gageodo, also known as Soheuksando due to its location near Heuksan-do, is an island in the Yellow Sea. It is within the administrative boundaries of Sinan County, Jeollanam-do, South Korea, and is connected by the Namhae Star ferry to the city of Mokpo. The island's  are home to about 470 people.

Gageodo is meteorologically significant, due to its location near the southern limit of the Yellow Sea Cold Current. In 2005, the South Korean government announced plans for a marine science base on the island.

See also
Islands of South Korea

Islands of South Jeolla Province
Islands of the Yellow Sea
Sinan County, South Jeolla